Papiya Nunatak (‘Nunatak Papiya’ \'nu-na-tak pa-'pi-ya\) is the rocky hill rising to 666 m in the south foothills of Detroit Plateau on Nordenskjöld Coast in Graham Land, Antarctica, north of the terminus of Drygalski Glacier. It is surmounting Kladorub Glacier to the northeast and Vrachesh Glacier to the southwest.

The nunatak is named after Papiya Peak on the Bulgarian Black Sea coast.

Location
British mapping in 1978.

Map
 British Antarctic Territory.  Scale 1:200000 topographic map.  DOS 610 Series, Sheet W 64 60.  Directorate of Overseas Surveys, UK, 1978.

Notes

References
 Papiya Nunatak. SCAR Composite Antarctic Gazetteer.
 Bulgarian Antarctic Gazetteer. Antarctic Place-names Commission. (details in Bulgarian, basic data in English)

External links
 Papiya Nunatak. Copernix satellite image

Nunataks of Graham Land
Bulgaria and the Antarctic
Nordenskjöld Coast